The 1979 Pro Bowl was the NFL's 29th annual all-star game which featured the outstanding performers from the 1978 season. The game was played on Monday, January 29, 1979, at Los Angeles Memorial Coliseum in Los Angeles, California before a crowd of 38,333. The final score was NFC 13, AFC 7.

Bum Phillips of the Houston Oilers lead the AFC team against an NFC team coached by Los Angeles Rams head coach Ray Malavasi. The referee was Jerry Markbreit in his second year as a referee.

Ahmad Rashad of the Minnesota Vikings was named the game's Most Valuable Player. Players on the winning NFC team received $5,000 apiece while the AFC participants each took home $2,500.

As of 2019, this was the last Pro Bowl to be played on a Monday, and the last one to be played in Los Angeles. It was the last one to be played outside Hawaii until the 2010 Pro Bowl which was in Miami Gardens, Florida.

This was also the first Pro Bowl to have players sport their respective team helmets, a custom that still stands today.

Rosters

AFC

Rookies in Italics

NFC

 
Rookies in Italics

References

External links

Pro Bowl
Pro Bowl
Pro Bowl
Pro Bowl
1979 in Los Angeles
National Football League in Los Angeles
American football competitions in Los Angeles
January 1979 sports events in the United States